Kenneth Claiborne Royall, Sr. (July 24, 1894May 25, 1971) was a U.S. Army general, and the last man to hold the office of Secretary of War, which secretariat was abolished in 1947. Royall served as the first Secretary of the Army from 1947 to 1949, until he was compelled into retirement for refusing to obey and realize President Harry S. Truman’s Executive Order 9981 for the racial desegregation of the military forces of the United States.

Early life and career
Kenneth Caliborne Royall was born on July 24, 1894, in Goldsboro, North Carolina, the son of Clara Howard Jones and George Pender Royall. He graduated from  Episcopal High School and the University of North Carolina at Chapel Hill, where he was a member of the Delta Kappa Epsilon fraternity, and Harvard Law School before serving in World War I. He then practiced law and was elected to the North Carolina Senate as a Democrat. At the beginning of World War II, he became a colonel in the US Army.

On August 18, 1917, Royall married the former Margaret Pierce Best, with whom he had two sons and one daughter, Kenneth Claiborne, Jr., Margaret, and George Pender Royall.

According to a 2006 newspaper column by Jack Betts, eight German agents bent on mayhem came ashore on Long Island in 1942 but were soon caught and ordered to stand trial in a secret military tribunal. US President Franklin Roosevelt appointed Royall to defend them, but, wanting a swift conclusion to the process, with the Germans executed as soon as possible, ordered Royall to avoid civilian courts. Royall wrote to Roosevelt that he thought that the president had no authority to convene a secret court to try his clients, and asked him to change his order. The president refused, and Royall appealed to the US District Court, arguing the secret tribunal was unconstitutional.

The court rejected that argument and so Royall and other lawyers in his office appealed to the Supreme Court, which rejected Royall's argument in a brief announcement in July 1942 and upheld the right of the president to appoint a secret tribunal. However, Royall had succeeded in getting civilian court review of the tribunals' constitutionality despite the president's predilection for secrecy.

The Supreme Court published a more detailed opinion in October, saying, "Constitutional safeguards for the protection of all who are charged with offense are not to be disregarded." By then, six of Royall's clients were dead. They had been tried, convicted, and executed in August, days after the Supreme Court's brief announcement upholding Roosevelt's tribunals. Two who turned themselves in and betrayed the others were sent to prison. Royall later said he believed his defense of the Germans was his most important work in a long and illustrious career. He was promoted to brigadier general.

Truman administration
Royall served as Undersecretary of War from November 9, 1945 until July 18, 1947. President Truman named him Secretary of War in 1947. He became the first Secretary of the Army two months later.

In 1948, Royall refused to make public the documentary “Nuremberg: Its Lesson For Today”  because "due to policy changes, ‘Nuremberg’ was not in the interest of the ‘army or the nation’ and would not be released to the general public".
 
Royall was forced into retirement in April 1949 for continuing to refuse to desegregate the Army, nearly a year after President Truman promulgated Executive Order 9981.

Later life and death
In December 1949, Royall became a partner at the prestigious New York City law firm of Dwight, Harris, Koegel and Caskey, becoming the firm's head in 1958. The firm was later renamed Rogers & Wells, and it was subsequently known as Clifford Chance Rogers & Wells after its merger with British firm Clifford Chance.

Royall died in Durham, North Carolina, on May 25, 1971, aged 76. He was buried at Willow Dale Cemetery in Goldsboro, North Carolina.

His son, Kenneth C. Royall, Jr. (1918–1999) served in the North Carolina House of Representatives from 1967 to 1972, and the North Carolina Senate from 1973 to 1992.

References

External links
Charlotte Observer: Royall was also willing to stand for rule of law
Official Army biography and portrait
History News Network article on Nazi saboteur case

Generals of World War II

1894 births
1971 deaths
National Guard (United States) generals
American military personnel of World War I
United States Army generals of World War II
American people of World War II
American segregationists
Harvard Law School alumni
University of North Carolina at Chapel Hill alumni
United States Army generals
United States Secretaries of the Army
United States Secretaries of War
New York (state) lawyers
North Carolina lawyers
Democratic Party North Carolina state senators
People from Goldsboro, North Carolina
Politicians from Durham, North Carolina
Military personnel from North Carolina
Truman administration cabinet members
20th-century American politicians